Manuel Alejandro Arteaga Rubianes (born 17 June 1994) is a Venezuelan professional footballer who plays as a forward for Phoenix Rising FC in the USL Championship.

Club career

Zulia
Arteaga began his career with Zulia FC. where he made his debut on the 15/8/2010 in a 4-1 victory over Atlético El Vigía.  He scored his first senior goal against Deportivo Petare on 20 February 2011, coming on as a 69th minute sub he scored in the 85th minute to seal a 1-0 victory for his team. On 30 October 2011 Arteaga scored a 67th-minute equaliser (2-2) against Estudiantes de Mérida it ended 2-2. He scored in the 8th minute beating Trujillanos FC 1-0 on 6 November 2011. Arteaga scored the only goal in the 1-0 match v Anzoátegui on 15 April 2012, he also scored the first goal in the 18th minute against Yaracuyanos FC on 22 April 2012 where his team won 2-1 away from home.

In January 2011 he went on trial with Liverpool but they declined to sign him.
In May 2011 he went on trial with Fiorentina but they did not sign him after the period expired.

Parma
On 31 August 2012, Arteaga signed a loan deal with Parma.

Palermo
On 7 December 2015, Italian Serie A club U.S. Città di Palermo announced the signing of the promising Venezuelan, for €800,000.

Hajduk Split
Arteaga signed a loan deal with Croatian football club Hajduk Split on 25 January 2016 and made his debut as a substitute against NK Slaven Belupo in February that year. On 20 February 2016, he played against NK Lokomotiva in an away defeat where he was substituted at halftime. After that game, Artega didn't play for Hajduk anymore for reasons unknown. On 7 June 2016, his loan spell with Hajduk Split was terminated.

Indy Eleven
On 11 January 2021, USL Championship club Indy Eleven announced that they had signed Arteaga. On June 7, 2022, Arteaga was named player of the week for Week 13 of the 2022 USL Championship season. He was released by Indy Eleven on November 30, 2022, following the conclusion of the 2022 season.

Phoenix Rising FC
Arteaga signed with Phoenix Rising FC on December 13, 2022.

International career
On 13 March 2011 in the Sudamericano U-17 2011. Arteaga scored twice away to Brazil U-17 in the 5th and 8th minute, the score ended 4-3 to Venezuela. He made his full international debut as a Substitute on 7 August 2011 in a friendly under César Farías against El Salvador, losing the match 2-1.

Career statistics

Club

International

References

External links
 

1994 births
Living people
Sportspeople from Maracaibo
Venezuelan footballers
Association football forwards
Venezuela international footballers
Venezuelan Primera División players
Zulia F.C. players
Deportivo Anzoátegui players
Parma Calcio 1913 players
HNK Hajduk Split players
Croatian Football League players
Expatriate footballers in Croatia
Venezuela under-20 international footballers
Venezuela youth international footballers
Indy Eleven players
Phoenix Rising FC players
Zamora FC players
Bolivian Primera División players
The Strongest players
Liga Portugal 2 players
Expatriate footballers in Bolivia
Expatriate footballers in Belgium
Expatriate footballers in Portugal